The Life's Romance of Adam Lindsay Gordon is a 1916 Australian feature-length film directed by W. J. Lincoln, based on the life of poet Adam Lindsay Gordon.

Unlike many Australian silent movies, part of the film survives today.

According to Lincoln's obituary in The Bulletin it was one of Lincoln's best films.

Plot
The story starts with Gordon's schooldays at Cheltenham College. Then details his career as a trooper in the Australian bush when he is given the task of escorting a lunatic to an asylum 200 miles away. He later resigns from the police force when he refuses to clean the sergeant's boots. He then becomes a horsebreaker and steeplechase rider.

Later, Gordon falls into debt and decides to shoot himself. The final scene is a shot of Gordon's grave in Brighton, Victoria.

The chapters were as follows:
Gordon's youth – Cheltenham College, England
Dormitory delights
Abduction of "Lallah Rooks"
The hum of hoarse cheering
Gordon wins the Point to Point
The headmaster hears of the race
Captain Gordon despairs of his son
How a man should uphold the sports of his land
Gordon fights and knocks out a bully
Gordon is expelled from college
Gordon's first love story
Gordon meets Jane Bridges
A wild west country ball
Gordon falls in love with Jane
Mrs Gordon chides her son concerning Jane
Gordon announces his love and defies his parents
Gordon puts his fate to the test
Gordon's clandestine visit to Jane
Gordon declares his love for Jane
Gordon parting from Jane
Gordon leaves England
On board the outward bound vessel
The Land of gold – Australia
Gordon in Australia
Gordon joins the mounted police
Gordon arrests the circus clown in error
An amusing denouement
Gordon meets Trainor
The beginning of a lifelong friendship
A maniac at large
Gordon attempts his capture singlehanded
Gordon captures maniac and seals his fate
A dramatic meeting
Gordon encounters Maggie Park
His Australian romance
Gordon escorts maniac 200 miles
Bush camp fire – memories
Maniac attempts Gordon's life
Gordon's miraculous escape
Gordon resigns from the police
Gordon again meets Trainor
Their horsebreaking career
Gordon meets Maggie Park a second time
Gordon engaged on Park Station
A country steeplechase
Gordon falls in is severely injured
Nursed back to life by Maggie
Gordon declares his love
They ride eighty miles to the nearest church
Gordon and Maggie are married
Scene from the Wreck
The midnight ride along Northumberland Road
Down with the sliprails
Gallop for your souls
Two years later at Mount Gambier
The bailiff in the home
Gordon in adversity
The £7000 legacy
Fortune comes to Gordon
Gordon and party on "pounding" expedition
Gordon's famous leap near the Blue Lake
The Blue Lake, Mount Gambier
Gordon engaged to ride Prince Rupert
Gordon intimidated by an unscrupulous Jew
Gordon deals effectively with the Hebrew
Flemington Racecourse 1808
Prince Rupert Falls
Gordon dazed – remounts
The crash of the splintering wood
Prince Rupert's second fall
Gordon seriously injured
Gordon recovers from his accident
News of Gordon's prospective inheritance
Gordon obtains an advance from a moneylender
The editor's room of the Australasian
Sea Spray and Smoke Drift rejected
Gordon's cup of bitterness
Gordon receives news of his disinheritance
Gordon meets Kendall
They adjourn to the Argus bar
Kendall shows Gordon his criticism of Bush Ballads
Gordon and Kendall spend their last shilling
Gordon walks to Brighton
Gordon loses all hope
Gordon broods by the fireside
And when the morning breaks
He shoulders his gun
His pathetic parting with Maggie
Gun in his hand he walks along the beach
A fisherman greets Gordon
Gordon enters the tea tree scrub
The passing of Gordon's soul
The bushman reads his life story
The 1916 "Gordon" pilgrimage to Brighton
Amongst Gordon's old friends
The shower of sun-kissed wattle

Cast
Hugh McCrae as Adam Lindsay Gordon
Alfred Harford as maniac
Jane Bridges as Gordon's first sweetheart
Maggie Park as Gordon's wife

Production
The film was made by a partnership that W. J. Lincoln entered into with G.H. Barnes following his stint with J. C. Williamson Ltd.

The star, Hugh McCrae, had a background as a theatre actor. He went on to become a noted essayist.

Pre-production started in June 1916. The shoot seems to have taken place from mid July to mid August, on location and in the JC Williamson's Studios.

Filming was difficult with the production often short of funds – one on occasion an actor and cameraman seized the camera so they could get paid.

Barnes and Lincoln were sued by Amalgamated Pictures.

Lincoln fell ill with alcoholic poisoning and spent some time in hospital, forcing Barnes to take over direction.

Filming took at least 14 days.

Reception
William Trainor, a close friend of Gordon's, saw the film and wrote a letter of congratulations to Lincoln and Barnes saying:
Dear Friends, I cannot permit another day to pass without offering my congratulations and an explanation of my feelings on seeing the life's phases of my dear friend and comrade, Adam Lindsay Gordon, depicted so faithfully and realistically on the screen. With the material at your disposal, I think you have accomplished wonders, and in years to come your picture will prove an historic production. So vivid were some of the scenes that even the forty years since his passing has not dimmed the memory of them, and tears welled in my eyes. I feel that your picture will help Australians to understand Gordon as I knew him, one of Nature's True and Noble Gentlemen. You have my earnest well wishes for success in your praiseworthy work, and in saying this I think I voice the sentiments of all those friends who knew him well.
One writer said that "fairly judged, it [the film] is a not unsuccessful effort to produce in Australia a pictorial presentation of a purely Australian and deeply interesting subject." The Register called it "a realistic representation of the romantic life of their most popular poet, and the authors are deserving of tho highest commendation for their success." The critic from the Advertiser said that:
The writers... have been careful in their adherence to its varying episodes, never straining after a dramatic eltect to the detriment of true story. The film has achieved surprising results since its first introduction to Australian audiences, and the possibilities of its success in England may be gauged from the fact that a leading London film company offered over four figures for the English rights of the production... Throughout the story a charming love romance moves, and gives to the picture that pathetic realism with which life would be divested of its chief fascination. All the characters were chosen from types. Particularly is this so in the case of the hero, whom critics claim to be "Gordon to the life".
The film had a popular run in Adelaide but was not a big success at the box office. Lincoln died shortly afterward.

Barnes was later reported as saying "the venture was not conspicuously successful, being planned on artistic lines, and too ambitious. He admits too that technically the film was not comparable in a   favorable light with a   picture made under perfect conditions, but regards the episode as vastly useful experience."

References

External links
 
 The Life's Romance of Adam Lindsay Gordon at National Film and Sound Archive
The Life's Romance of Adam Lindsay Gordon at AustLit
"Life's Romance of Adam Lindsay Gordon" "Lincoln" The Life's Romance of Adam Lindsay Gordon at Trove

1916 films
Australian black-and-white films
Australian silent feature films
Films directed by W. J. Lincoln